Abdul Wahab (1916–1994) was a Bangladeshi journalist. He was awarded Ekushey Padak in 1979 by the Government of Bangladesh.

Career
After the Liberation of Bangladesh, Wahab edited The Liberation of Bangladesh, The Dhaka Daily and Morning News. He also served as a faculty in journalism at the University of Dhaka.

Works

 One Man's Agony: A Sketch Book of Yahyan Oppression

References

1916 births
1994 deaths
Recipients of the Ekushey Padak
Academic staff of the University of Dhaka
Bangladeshi journalists
20th-century journalists